Javier María Vázquez López (born 24 September 2000), known as Javi Vázquez, is a Spanish professional footballer who plays as a left back for UD Ibiza.

Club career
Born in Alcalá de Guadaíra, Seville, Andalusia, Vázquez represented Sevilla FC as a youth. He made his senior debut with the C-team on 15 April 2018, starting and scoring the opener in a 2–0 Tercera División home win against Atlético Onubense.

On 6 May 2018, aged only 17, Vázquez made his professional debut with the reserves by starting in a 0–1 away loss against CD Lugo in the Segunda División. He made his first-team debut on 1 November, starting in a 0–0 away draw against CF Villanovense, for the season's Copa del Rey.

On 15 January 2021, Vázquez was transferred to Segunda División B side UD Ibiza, and helped in their first-ever promotion to the second tier at the end of the season. On 30 January 2022, after being rarely used, he was loaned to Racing de Santander in Primera División RFEF until June.

Career statistics

Personal life
Vázquez's father Ramón was also a footballer. A forward, he was also groomed at Sevilla. His older brother Ramón works as an analyst for Sevilla, while his younger brother Manolo plays as a midfielder for Sevilla's youth A team.

Notes

References

External links
 
 
 

2000 births
Living people
People from Seville (comarca)
Sportspeople from the Province of Seville
Spanish footballers
Footballers from Andalusia
Association football defenders
Segunda División players
Primera Federación players
Segunda División B players
Tercera División players
Sevilla FC C players
Sevilla Atlético players
Sevilla FC players
UD Ibiza players
Racing de Santander players
Spain youth international footballers